Leonardo Gubinelli (born 27 August 2000) is a Swiss footballer who plays as a right midfielder for Kriens.

Career
Gubinelli made his professional debut for TSV Havelse in the 3. Liga on 26 January 2022 against Wehen Wiesbaden, coming on as a substitute for Julian Rufidis in the 74th minute.

On 2 August 2022, Gubinelli signed with Kriens.

References

External links
 
 
 

2000 births
Living people
Swiss men's footballers
Association football midfielders
TSV Havelse players
SC Kriens players
Swiss Promotion League players
3. Liga players
Swiss expatriate footballers
Expatriate footballers in Germany
Swiss expatriate sportspeople in Germany